Nile Drilling & Services is South Sudan’s first locally owned and run petroleum drilling company.

History
When Sudan and South Sudan split in 2011, the countries signed a Cooperation Agreement. The two countries agreed that facilities in the south would remain in the South Sudan and those in the north will be owned by Sudan. The rigs inherited in the oilfields of South Sudan were said to be old and needed to be decommissioned.

Nilepet founded Nile Drilling as a joint venture national oil company in 2017, 6 years after South Sudan became independent. The recently established company will receive its first workover rig in 2017, with more workover rigs and drilling rigs on order for 2018.

Staff
Nile Drilling is 51-percent publicly owned.

President: Kamal Mabok

Motto
Vision
A leading and competitive integrated oil drilling and service company of choice.

Goal
To maximize its value by growing to become a multi-faceted oil field service company in the country.

Mission
To explore, manage and add value to the petroleum resources in an effective and environmentally sound manner.
To promote the sustainability and growth of the national oil and gas industry, safeguard the national interest and high return.
To be socially responsible and environmentally friendly business enti

References

Petroleum in South Sudan
Oil and gas companies of South Sudan
Oil fields in South Sudan
Oil pipelines in South Sudan